Yury Yurkun (originally Juozas Jurkūnas; September 17, 1895 – September 20, 1938) was a Russian writer and painter, and lover of poet Mikhail Kuzmin.

Early life

Yurkun was born in Lithuania on September 17, 1895, from a Catholic family. The original name is Juozas, written as Iosif (Иосиф) in Russian.

Personal life
Yuri Yurkun was the lover of poet Mikhail Kuzmin, who dedicated to him the cycle, "On the Journey" ("V doroge", dated February–August 1913). They met in Kiev in February 1913. Kuzmin wrote in his diary, on March 3, 1913: "I just cannot get my writing going; the closest possible friendship with Nagrodskaya, my love for Yurkun, my departure from the Sudeikins - that is all that has happened."

Yurkun's profession in Kiev is unknown. He was possibly an actor working under the pseudonym "Mogandri." Others state he was a clerk in a bookstore. He went back to St. Petersburg with Kuzmin and they remained together until Kuzmin's death in 1936.

While with Kuzmin, Yurkun also had a relationship with Nadezhda Zborovskaya-Auslender, an actress and wife of Kuzmin's nephew. The relationship with Kuzmin was not easy as the poet writes: "I love him very much, but his obstinacy and hooliganism will destroy him, no doubt about it" (Diary, May 27, 1913).

In 1917 Yurkun was conscripted by the Bolsheviks, but deserted soon after. Yurkun and Kuzmin lived in St. Petersburg from 1918 to 1921. In 1918 Yurkun was arrested and detained for a brief period.

In December 1920, Yurkun met his future wife, Olga Gildebrandt Arbenina, a young actress using the stage name of her father, Arbenin. The marriage legally never happened, but they considered themselves married. Yurkun, Arbenina and Kuzmin continued to live together with Yurkun's mother in the same communal apartment.

In 1931 the secret police searched their apartment and confiscated Yurkun's manuscripts, forcing him to sign an agreement to cooperate. Two years after Kuzmin's death, in 1938, Yurkun was arrested and soon after executed in a massive political purge.

Gallery

References

1895 births
1938 deaths
Bisexual men
Russian painters
Russian LGBT poets
Russian male poets
Bisexual writers
20th-century Russian poets
20th-century Russian LGBT people